The following lists events that happened during 1961 in North Vietnam.

Events

January
 January 30 - President of the United States John F. Kennedy approved a $41 million counterinsurgency plan in North Vietnam, drawn up for President Eisenhower by General Edward Lansdale, to help the government of South Vietnam resist communist aggression. Designed to add 52,000 men to that nation's army and civil guards, the plan included provisions for American soldiers and military advisers to assist in the effort.

February
 February 28 - Under United States law, 38 U.S.C. §101 (29)(A), the Vietnam Era refers to "The period beginning on February 28, 1961, and ending on May 7, 1975, in the case of a veteran who served in the Republic of Vietnam during that period."

September
 September 18 - For the first time, troops from North Vietnam seized control of a provincial capital in South Vietnam, capturing Phuoc Vinh in a predawn attack, only 55 miles from Saigon.  The ARVN recaptured the city the next day, but not before the Governor of the Phuoc Thanh province was publicly beheaded, along with the top military officers, and the government buildings burned.

References

 
Years of the 20th century in North Vietnam
1960s in North Vietnam
North Vietnam
North
North Vietnam